Vílchez or Vilchez is a surname. Notable people with the surname include:

Francisco Javier Rodríguez Vílchez (born 1978), Spanish footballer who currently plays for Alicante CF, as a striker
Manuel Vilchez (born 1961), former Venezuelan boxer
Nidia Vílchez, Peruvian politician and Congresswoman representing Junín for the 2006–2011 term
Oscar Vílchez (born 1986), Peruvian football attacking midfielder, currently playing for Alianza Lima
Walter Vílchez (born 1982), Peruvian football player